Eclipse Glacier is a glacier flowing southwest into the northern part of Jacobsen Bight on the south coast of South Georgia Island. It was so named by the British South Georgia Survey, 1954–55, led by George A. Sutton.

See also
 List of glaciers in the Antarctic
 Glaciology

References 

Glaciers of South Georgia